Satasi Raj was the Kingdom of Raja of Rudrapur covering over half of north and east India in pre-British era.

Background
Rudrapur is a town and a nagar panchayat in Deoria district in the Indian state of Uttar Pradesh. Previously known as Satasi Raj.

Recorded history of the dynasty

According to one existing version, the founding members of the Satasi royal family are said to have come to Awadh, from the banks of the Rapti river.

Modern Era

The Maharajah (Emperor) system was abolished by Indian Constitution in 1971 with some acceptable privileges.

Controversy

Given that royalty was abolished by Indian Constitution in 1971.

References

 History OnlineRudrapur.com
 Royal Families

External links
 OnlineRudrapur.com
 Business guide to Rudrapur
Fam History of India ous Person Of Rudrapur